
Gmina Lubień is a rural gmina (administrative district) in Myślenice County, Lesser Poland Voivodeship, in southern Poland.

Villages
Gmina Lubień contains the villages and settlements of Krzeczów, Lubień, Skomielna Biała and Tenczyn.

Neighbouring gminas
Gmina Lubień is bordered by the gminas of Jordanów, Mszana Dolna, Pcim, Raba Wyżna, Rabka-Zdrój and Tokarnia.

References
 Polish official population figures 2006

Lubien
Myślenice County